The list of ship launches in 1743 includes a chronological list of some ships launched in 1743.


References

1743
Ship launches